Eric G. Swedin is an American author of science fiction and academic nonfiction works. He is a professor of history at Weber State University in Utah. Swedin is the 2010 long form winner of the Sidewise Award for his alternate history novel When Angels Wept: A What-If History of the Cuban Missile Crisis. He was a consultant for the Emmy Award-winning documentary, Clouds Over Cuba, which was created for the John F. Kennedy Presidential Library and Museum.

Biography
Swedin is a professor of history at Weber State University in Utah. He has written several non-fiction textbooks and academic works, as well as five novels, and his books and papers have been cited in over 70 academic works. He won the Sidewise Award for his 2010 alternate history novel, When Angels Wept: A What-If History of the Cuban Missile Crisis. He was a consultant on two documentaries about the Cuban Missile Crisis: Clouds Over Cuba, which won an Emmy Award, and What If...? Armageddon 1962, a documentary which aired on the Military Channel in 2014.

Bibliography

Nonfiction
Healing Souls: Psychotherapy in the Latter-day Saint Community (2003, University of Illinois Press)
Science in the Contemporary World: An Encyclopedia (2005, part of the History of Science series, ABC-CLIO)
Science Fiction and Computing: Essays on Interlinked Domains (2011, McFarland & Company, as editor with David L. Ferro)
Survive the Bomb: The Radioactive Citizen's Guide to Nuclear Survival (2011, Zenith Press, as editor)

Essays
"Murray Leinster and 'A Logic Named Joe'" (2011, with David L. Ferro, in Science Fiction and Computing: Essays on Interlinked Domains, McFarland & Company)
"Rebooting 'A Logic Named Joe': Exploring the Multiple Influences of a Strangely Predictive Mid-1940s Short Story" (2011, with David L. Ferro, in Science Fiction and the Prediction of the Future: Essays on Foresight and Fallacy, McFarland & Company)

Fiction
The Killing of Greybird (2004, CFI)
When Angels Wept: A What-If History of the Cuban Missile Crisis (2010, Potomac Books)
Anasazi Exile (2011, Borgo Press/Wildside Press)
Fragments of Me (2012, Borgo Press/Wildside Press)
Seeking Valhalla (2013, Borgo Press/Wildside Press)

Documentaries
Swedin consulted on Clouds Over Cuba and consulted on and appeared in What If...? Armageddon 1962.
Clouds Over Cuba (2012, created by and aired at John F. Kennedy Presidential Library and Museum) This program won an Emmy Award for "New Approaches: Documentaries".
 What If...? Armageddon 1962 (2014, Military Channel)

References

External links
Alternatives: Histories of the Past and Future (Swedin's blog)

Year of birth missing (living people)
Living people
21st-century American novelists
21st-century American historians
American information and reference writers
American Latter Day Saints
American male novelists
American science fiction writers
American technology writers
American textbook writers
Computer science writers
Cuban Missile Crisis
Sidewise Award winners
Novelists from Utah
21st-century American male writers
American male non-fiction writers